Auriculoceryx transitiva is a species of moth in the family Erebidae. It is found on Borneo. The habitat consists of lowland areas.

References

External links
 Natural History Museum Lepidoptera generic names catalog

Moths described in 1862
Syntomini
Moths of Asia